Sweet Exorcist is a 1974 studio album by Curtis Mayfield. It peaked at number 39 on the Billboard 200 chart, as well as number 2 on the Top R&B/Hip-Hop Albums chart.

Track listing

Personnel
Credits adapted from liner notes.

 Curtis Mayfield – production
 Rich Tufo – arrangement (except "Power to the People", "Kung Fu", and "Suffer")
 Gil Askey – arrangement (on "Power to the People", "Kung Fu", and "Suffer")
 R. Anfinsen – engineering
 J. Janus – engineering
 Milton Sincoff – creative packaging design
 Bill Ronalds – illustration
 Marv Stuart – management

Charts

References

External links
 

1974 albums
Curtis Mayfield albums
Albums produced by Curtis Mayfield
Curtom Records albums